Vadim Petrovich Starkov (born 20 April 1979) is a Russian professional football coach and a former player. He is a director of sports and assistant coach with FC Salyut Belgorod.

Club career
He made his debut in the Russian Premier League in 2001 for FC Chernomorets Novorossiysk.

Honours
 Russian Cup finalist: 2005.

References

1979 births
Sportspeople from Pskov
Living people
Russian footballers
Association football defenders
FC Chernomorets Novorossiysk players
FC Khimki players
FC Lada-Tolyatti players
FC Salyut Belgorod players
Russian Premier League players
FC Energomash Belgorod players